Kanalia is a village in Thessaly, Greece, part of the municipality Rigas Feraios. It is one of the prettiest on the north-west side of Pelion. It is built on the foundation of the Acropolis Voivis in the plains of Metochi. On the hill above the village one can see the remains of the walls of ancient Voivis, the Homeric Boebe, as well as the ruins of three forts that protected the road. Kanalia, Kapourna and  make up the first municipality of Voivis in Volos. The church of Saint Nicolas (11th century), can be found in the area. Visitors to the area enjoy the plethora of almond trees when they are in blossom, they can even attend the celebration of the Blossoming Almond trees.

There is a lake in the area named Lake Karla by the previous name of Kanalia village which was drained between 1960 and 2000. Since 2001 the Greek Government has attempted to reconstruct the lake to its previous size, through the financial aid of European Union and Natura 2000.

References 

Populated places in Pelion
Populated places in Magnesia (regional unit)